Craugastor silvicola, also known as the forest robber frog, is a species of frog in the family Craugastoridae. It is endemic to Mexico and only known from its type locality near Zanatepec, Oaxaca, on the Isthmus of Tehuantepec.

Description
The head is as wide as the body and slightly broader than long; the snout is rounded. The canthus rostralis is sharp. The tympanum is visible and relatively large. The fingers are long and slender with greatly expanded fingertips. The toes lack webbing and fringes; the toe tips are enlarged. The coloration (in alcohol) is drab: dorsum and flanks are gray to cream with brown markings; the venter is immaculate.

Habitat and conservation
It is a very rare frog that is threatened by habitat loss caused by logging and agricultural expansion.

References

silvicola
Endemic amphibians of Mexico
Amphibians described in 1967
Taxa named by John Douglas Lynch
Taxonomy articles created by Polbot